

The Fieseler Fi 168 was a projected German ground attack aircraft designed in 1938 by Frederik Kassel, who created the aircraft after a request from the Technisches Amt (Technical Department) of the RLM Reichsluftfahrtministerium - (German aviation ministry).

The two-engine aircraft was a strut-braced high-wing monoplane with two tail-booms and a narrow fuselage pod carried by struts under the centre-section, and was designed to operate in areas featuring rough terrain, and boasted two rigidly mounted forward-facing machine guns. The former development director Erich Bachem described the Fi 168 as a flying "tank destroyer".

The project was discontinued at the direction of the RLM in September 1939.

References

Abandoned military aircraft projects of Germany
World War II ground attack aircraft of Germany